Chamlu Gabin (also Romanized as Chamlū Gabīn; also known as Yāhalīq (Persian: ياهليق), Chamlagaban, Chamleh Jaban, and Chamlūgaben) is a village in Shal Rural District, Shahrud District, Khalkhal County, Ardabil Province, Iran.

It is located in the Alborz (Elburz) mountain range.

At the 2006 census, its population was 68, in 20 families.

References 

Towns and villages in Khalkhal County
Settled areas of Elburz